Galderma S.A. is a Swiss pharmaceutical company specializing in dermatological treatments and skin care products. Formerly a subsidiary of L'Oréal and Nestlé, it has been held by a consortium of private institutional investors since 2019.

Galderma was formed in 1981 as a joint venture between Nestlé and L'Oréal, then it became a subsidiary of Nestlé. Since 2019, it belongs to an investment fund. The company, headed by president and CEO Flemming Ørnskov (ex-Shire), has 33 sites in 100 countries with a worldwide network of distributors and employs more than 4,600 people. The headquarters is based in Zug, Switzerland. In 2021, the slogan of Galderma is "Advancing dermatology for every skin story".

History 

The origins of Galderma date back to 1961 and the founding of the Owen dermatology company in Dallas, Texas, USA by M. Owen.

In 1979, Professor Hans Schaefer founded the International Center for Dermatological Research (CIRD) in Sophia Antipolis, with the support of the CEO of L'Oréal, François Dalle, who wanted to diversify his cosmetic research into the drug sector. At the same time, Nestlé, which also had ambitions in dermatology bought the Owen laboratory.

L'Oréal and Nestlé joined forces to create Galderma in 1981 (CIRD became Galderma R&D). It was a joint venture between the two companies.

In 2007, the Galderma Global Corporate Campaign won the Medical Marketing Association's International Award of Excellence.

In 2010, sales reached 1.2 billion euros, an increase of 16.1% over 2009.

Galderma expanded by specializing in the research, development and commercialization of products for dermatology (skin care) patients. It reached a significant size, with 38 subsidiaries present in 100 countries in the 2010s. It diversified into aesthetic medicine products with the botulinum toxin Azzalure, a field in which it strengthened in 2010 with the acquisition of the Swedish medical-device company Q-Med.

In 2014, Nestlé bought back all the shares from L'Oréal, thus creating a new unit of Nestlé group called Nestle Skin Health. The transaction had a value of €3.1 billion (US$4.23 billion) and was paid for by Nestlé with 21.2 million L'Oréal shares. L'Oréal paid €3.4 billion (US$4.63 billion) for the remaining 27.3 million shares.

In 2019, Nestlé sold Galderma for $10.2 billion to a consortium comprising the EQT VIII fund, Luxinva (a wholly owned subsidiary of Abu Dhabi Investment Authority), PSP Investments and other institutional investors. Since then, it has been the largest independent dermatology company in the world.

In November 2021, Galderma bought California-based Alastin, a firm specialising in specialist skincare products, for an undisclosed price.

In June 2022, Galderma announced positive results in two Phase III trials for liquid botulinum toxin A, showing RelabotulinumtoxinA significantly reduced frown line severity and was well tolerated. This result primes the company to apply for approval in the US and other global markets.

Also in June 2022, Galderma announced positive data from Phase III trial, showing efficacy and safety of nemolizumab in patients with prurigo nodularis. Nemolizumab is a monoclonal antibody that blocks the signaling of IL-31, a neuroimmune cytokine involved in the pathogenesis of prurigo nodularis.

Activities 
Galderma is specialized in the research, development and commercialization of skin care products and treatments across aesthetics, consumer care and prescription medicine.

Galderma provides a range of over-the-counter and prescription dermatological products for skin care, aesthetics and treatment of conditions including acne, rosacea, psoriasis and other steroid-responsive dermatoses (SRD), onychomycosis (fungal nail infections), pigmentary disorders, skin cancer and skin aging. Galderma's activities are divided into three business units: aesthetics, consumer care and prescription medicine. Galderma's products are sold in more than 100 countries.

Aesthetics 
In 2007, Galderma and Ipsen signed a licensing agreement for the distribution of the botulinum toxin Dysport, known as Azzalure in the European Union, for the improvement of glabellar lines (frown lines between the eyes). More than 40 million treatments have been performed in the United States and the European Union.

The main brands are Restylane, Azzalure, Dysport, Alluzience and Sculptra.

Consumer care 
Galderma's products are available over-the-counter to consumers. 

The main consumer care brands are Cetaphil, with its range of skin care products for all ages; Benzac and Differin OTC for mild-to-moderate acne; and Loceryl, used to treat fungal nail infections, and Alastin.

Prescription Medicine 
Disease areas are atopic dermatitis, dermato-oncology and psoriasis. 

The main brands are Aklief, Benzac, Cetaphil, Epiduo, Epiduo Forte, Loceryl, Differin, Soolantra, Mirvaso, Oracea and Metvix.

Research and development 
The company invests substantially in research and development and sources new treatments from its own activities and from its partnerships with others. It divides its research and development departments between six sites:

Lausanne, Switzerland
Zug, Switzerland
Uppsala, Sweden
Dallas, Texas
Bridgewater, New Jersey
Baie d’Urfé, Canada

Production 
Galderma has manufacturing facilities at the following locations:

 The Alby-sur-Chéran plant in France, inaugurated in 1994, supplies over 70 countries.
 The Baie d'Urfé (Montreal) facility in Canada started production in 2000 and supplies North America. 
 The plant in Uppsala, Sweden, manufactures aesthetic and corrective products.
 The Hortolândia site in the state of São Paulo, Brazil serves South America.

Governance 

 Flemming Ørnskov, chief executive officer
 Thomas Dittrich chief financial officer 
 Adrian Murphy, vice president, head of global operations
 Allison Pinkham, chief human resources officer

Notes and references

See also 
 List of pharmaceutical companies
 Pharmaceutical industry in Switzerland

Companies based in Lausanne
Pharmaceutical companies of Switzerland
L'Oréal
Nestlé
Skin care
Health care
Pharmaceutical companies established in 1981
Swiss companies established in 1981
2019 mergers and acquisitions